Condylorrhiza is a genus of moths of the family Crambidae.

Species
Condylorrhiza epicapna (Meyrick, 1933)
Condylorrhiza oculatalis (Möschler, 1890)
Condylorrhiza vestigialis (Guenée, 1854)
Condylorrhiza zyphalis (Viette, 1958)

References

Spilomelinae
Crambidae genera
Taxa named by Julius Lederer